Mandela is a town in the Shekhawati region and Jhunjhunu district of Rajasthan state in India.

History

Mandrela was established in 1751, as one of the Thikanas of the Panchpana confederation of Jhunjhunu thikana by Raj-Shri Thakur Sahab Doulat Singh ji, third son of Rao Zorawar Singh ji - the ruler of Jhunjhunu state, and Grandson of Maharao Shardul Singh ji of Jhunjhunu Shekhawati Rajasthan.

Location 

Its Coordinates are 27°56'42"N 74°55'31"E .

Demographics 

Population of the village is around 30,000, mostly comprising two religions, Hindus and Muslims. There is a remarkable level of religious harmony between the two religious groups and it is quite common that these two groups celebrate festivals with each other. The village boasts several temples and mosques.

Economy 

Villagers are mostly farmers but lately they are shifting to service and trade related occupations. A large segment of workers remit funds from Arab countries. The decreasing reliance on agriculture and inflow of remittances has helped the village prosper.

Education 

The village has two Government primary schools, an upper primary school, and two government senior secondary schools. The village also has several CBSE affiliated private schools. The literacy rate is about 70% and is increasing rapidly due to rising awareness about education and its importance.

Transport 

The village is reachable by bus from nearby towns like Jhunjhunu, Pilani, Chirawa, etc. and is well connected to nearby places by privately owned buses. Nearest Railway Station located is in District headquarters-Jhunjhunu. Nearest Airport is Jaipur International Airport.

Climate 

Here summers are hot and arid with temperatures reaching as high as 50 °C. Sand storms and hot dry winds, called loo, are common phenomena. In May and June, loo becomes unbearable and may cause heatstroke. The place receives rainfall mostly in July, August, and September. Winters are severe and chilly with minimum temperature falling to 0 °C in January.

Geography 

As the place is located in the semi-desert region of the Thar, the landscape consists of sand dunes with scanty bushes. The main trees are Khejri, Neem, Peepal and Rohida.

Agriculture 

Being in the semi-desert part of Rajasthan, the farming land can grow crops which need less water.  The crops grown are mainly pearl millet (Bajra), moong, moth, til and gawar. Famines occur frequently. The rabi crop is almost non-existent and irrigation is rarely used.

Places of Worship 

There are many temples like, Shakambhari mata Temple, Hanuman Temple, Rani Sati dadi Temple, Gillo Sati Temple, Shree Shyam Mandir, Bankia Balaji, Baba Baldevdas Bagichi, Mota Mahadev Mandir etc. 
Jama Masjid and many mosques, which makes Mandela a religious place where both Hindus and Muslims live together in peace.

Administration 
 Current Sarpanch - Mr. Kuldeep Singh Shekhawat
 MLA Pilani Constituency - Mr. JP Chandelia (INC)
 MP Jhunjhunu Constituency - Mr. Narendra Kumar (BJP)

See also 

 Princely state

References 

Villages in Jhunjhunu district